In algebra, a Nakayama algebra or generalized uniserial algebra is an algebra such that each left or right indecomposable projective module has a unique composition series. They were studied by  who called them "generalized uni-serial rings".

An example of a Nakayama algebra is k[x]/(xn) for k a field and n a positive integer. 

Current usage of uniserial differs slightly: an explanation of the difference appears here.

References

Ring theory